Themistokli Gërmenji (1871 – 1917) was an Albanian nationalist figure and guerrilla fighter. One of the activists of the Albanian National Awakening and the leader of the Albanian irregulars from 1909 to 1914, he became the prefect of police of the Autonomous Albanian Republic of Korçë from 1916 until his execution due to a miscarriage of justice by a French military tribunal in 1917.

Biography

Family 
Themistokli was born in Gërmenji family in Korçë in 1871. His family was originally from Gërmenj, a village of modern-day Kolonjë of Albania, near border with Greece. Themistokli's grandfather Demetrius moved from Gërmenj to Korçë in 1860 and adopted Gërmenji as his last name. Because of economic reasons Themistokli's father Atanas moved from Korçë, first to Egypt and then to Bucharest and Istanbul. His mother Konstandina, wife Katarina, three sons (Spiro, Telemakun and Themistokli) and two daughters (Aleksandra and Efterpina) remained in Korçë.

Career 
After receiving his first education in Korçë, Themistokli emigrated to Romania in 1892 in search of work and settled in Bucharest at the age of 21. In Bucharest he was influenced by the rise of patriotic societies in the Albanian community. He returned to Korça and Monastir, where he and his brother opened the Liria (Freedom) Hotel, a center of the nationalist movement. That hotel was a centre of the Albanian activism of the Albanian National Awakening in planning the Congress of Monastir and Albanian revolts in the period 1909—1912.
Gërmenji was a supporter of the cooperation with Bulgarians. 

In 1911, he traveled to Italy and Greece to find support. In 1911 he was declared persona non grata in Greece because he refused to agree not to carry on nationalistic propaganda south of Vlora as a condition for cooperation with the Greek authorities against the Ottoman Empire. Gërmenji led an Albanian guerilla band composed of different religions and social classes fighting against the Ottoman Empire. While operating between Saranda and Gjirokastra, attempting to capture the military supplies of Ottoman army, he was seized and imprisoned in Ioannina. When he returned to Korça, he led one of two groups of Albanian irregulars around the region, when Albania was fragmented during the First World War (the other was led by Sali Butka).

He subsequently led the guerrilla forces in the Balkan Wars. During the first stages of the conflict between units of the Principality of Albania and the Autonomous Republic of Northern Epirus he participated at the battle of his native Korça, where the Albanian forces defended unsuccessfully the town against the attack by the forces of the pro-Greek Northern Epirus movement. Gërmenji fled to Sofia when Greek army reoccupied Korça in 1915. In October 1916, he traveled to Pogradec, which was occupied by Austrian and Bulgarian troops, to seek Austrian assistance. When he realized he would receive no help, he turned to the French, who had taken Korça in October 1916.

Autonomous Albanian Republic of Korçë 
 

French officers had a meeting with Gërmenji on November 24, 1916, before the French army occupied Korçë on November 29. Themistokli Gërmenji came to Korçë from Pogradec, which was occupied by the armies of Austria-Hungary and Bulgaria during Austro-Hungarian and Bulgarian occupation of Albania. The French officers appointed a commission led by Gërmenji.

The commission held a meeting on December 10 at 9 a.m. in the Saint George's School and Gërmenji gave a speech to the gathered men; after the meeting he led the commission to the prefecture. In the prefecture they met with Colonel Descoins and other French officers. Haki Shemshedini approached Colonel Descoins on behalf of the commission. Colonel Descoins informed the commission that they should sign a protocol, which they did: the protocol stipulated that an autonomous province would be established on the territories of Korçë, Bilishti, Kolonja, Opar and Gora. It was also agreed that the 14 members of the commission would make up the administrative council, responsible for maintaining the order.

On December 10, 1916, Henry Descoin, the commander of the French garrison of Korçë, after the approval from Maurice Sarrail, declared the Autonomous Albanian Republic of Korçë, and appointed Gërmenji as prefect. The new authorities in Korçë organized the police force and gendarmerie, a post office system and issued the postage stamps. Gërmenji set up Albanian schools throughout the villages of the region and discontinued the use of Turkish and Greek.

Gërmenji was awarded with the Croix de Guerre because he participated in the French capture of Pogradec with the battalion from Korçë. At the end of 1917 however Gërmenji was accused of collaboration with the Central Powers and summarily executed on 7 November in Thessaloniki after being sentenced to death by a French military court. It later became clear that the military tribunal had made a grave judicial error, its members having been led astray by Greek informers who wished Germenji removed since he was a powerful Albanian leader.

Legacy 
A statue of Gërmenji as a freedom fighter now stands in a main square of Korçë.

See also 
 Autonomous Province of Korçë
 Salih Butka

References

External links 
 
 
 Kosova.albemigrant website

1871 births
1917 deaths
Albanian Christians
Eastern Orthodox Christians from Albania
People from Korçë
20th-century Albanian military personnel
Activists of the Albanian National Awakening
Albanian politicians
Assassinated Albanian politicians